Reykjavík Airport (Icelandic: Reykjavíkurflugvöllur)  is the main domestic airport serving Reykjavík, the capital of Iceland, located about  from the city centre.

Having shorter runways than the city's larger Keflavík International Airport, which is sited  out of town, it only serves internal flights within Iceland, small international charters, transatlantic ferry flights and private flights. It can also serve as alternate airport for flights inbound towards Keflavík, in case of adverse weather conditions there. To distinguish from the larger Keflavík International Airport outside Reykjavík, it is sometimes unofficially in English called Reykjavik City Airport (also by the airport administration), and also Reykjavik Domestic Airport.

Reykjavík Airport is the main hub of Eagle Air and the domestic hub of Icelandair, and it currently has two runways (as of January 2022). Reykjavík Airport is owned and operated by the state enterprise Isavia.

History

The first flight from the airport area was 3 September 1919, with the takeoff of an Avro 504, the first aeroplane in Iceland. Until 1937, there were experiments with airline operations in Vatnsmýri, but with the foundation of Iceland's oldest airline, Flugfélag Akureyrar (now Icelandair) in Akureyri in 1938, operations began in the area and in March 1940 scheduled flights started when Flugfélag Akureyrar moved its hub from Akureyri to Reykjavík (and changed its name to Flugfélag Íslands).

The current airport was built by the British Army during World War II on the south coast of the Reykjavík peninsula. Construction began in October 1940, when the airport had only a grass surface. The Black Watch regiment built the first runway, constructing it over sunken oil barrels. The British Royal Air Force operated from the airport, then named RAF Reykjavik, from March 1941. On 6 July 1946, the British handed the airport operation over to the Icelandic government and since then it has been operated by the Icelandic Civil Aviation Authority (now Flugstoðir).

Renovation of the airport started in 2000 and lasted two years. This was followed by a referendum in 2001, with 49.3% of the votes for moving the airport out of the city centre, and 48.1% votes for it remaining in place until 2016, when the current urban plan expires. The outcome of these elections on the other hand was not binding because election participation was under 40% and the left wing majority made the decision to have such a clause for it to be binding and beyond that because these elections were not held properly in respect to certain legal technicalities that also resulted in no option for non-election day voting (for vacationers for example).

After renovation, the width of runways 01/19 and 13/31 are 45 m and 06/24 is 30 m, with visual approach for runways 01 and 31, while runway 19 has ILS CAT I/NBD-DME approach and runway 13 has LLZ-DME/NDB-DME approach. The lights for the runways were updated with LIH Wedge for all runways. 06/24 is permanently closed and being used as a taxiway, as of 2020.

Future
The city has grown around the airport and it is now located in the western part of the city. This location is considered inconvenient by many, for noise pollution and safety reasons and because it takes up a lot of otherwise useful area near downtown areas. There is an ongoing debate about the future of the airport, with the three options being: 
 leaving the airport as it is
 demolishing the airport and building a new airport elsewhere in the Reykjavík area
 demolishing the airport and moving all flight services to Keflavík International Airport
In 2001 there was a local referendum in Reykjavik on the matter, keep Reykjavík Airport at present location or move air traffic elsewhere within 15 years, where the result was fairly equal but a small overweight (49.3% against 48.1%) moving the traffic. However the turnout was only 37% and referendum was local, and Reykjavík Airport has not been relocated as of 2022.

Terminals
There are two terminals located on different sides of the runway area: 
 The main terminal handles traffic for Icelandair and Norlandair
 A smaller terminal which serves flights for Eagle Air

Airlines and destinations 
The following airlines operate regular scheduled and charter flights at Reykjavík Airport:

Other facilities
Icelandair Group and Icelandair have a head office at the airport. Isavia also have their head offices on the airport property. When Loftleiðir was in operation, its head office was at the airport.

Statistics

Ground transportation
There are some local city buses at both terminal buildings. BSÍ is a major bus terminal, located 1.6 km (1.0 mi) from the main airport terminal. At the bus terminal, Strætó provides bus service to areas around Reykjavik while Gray Line Iceland Excursions' Airportexpress and Reykjavik Excursions Kynnisferðir's Flybus services connect between Keflavík International Airport and Reykjavik Airport.

When changing between domestic and international flights a 50 km bus transfer between Reykjavík Airport and Keflavík International Airport is usually needed, and at least three hours between flights is recommended.

Accidents and incidents
 On 27 December 1980, Douglas C-47B N54605 of Visionair International was damaged beyond repair in a storm at Reykjavik Airport.
 On 3 August 1988, a CASA 212 Aviocar 200, belonging to the Canadian company Geoterrex crashed 900 metres short of the runway with the loss of the 3 Canadian scientists onboard. The crash was found to be a result of an incorrectly installed speeder spring in the right propeller governor. During the ILS approach, the props on the right side suddenly went into a setting called "ground flat" (or possibly slightly into reverse). This gave a huge power difference between the left and the right engine.

References

External links

Reykjavík Airport at Isavia 
Reykjavík Airport at the Icelandic Civil Aviation Administration 
Reykjavík Airport at the Icelandic Civil Aviation Administration 

Airports in Iceland
Transport in Reykjavík
Civilian airports with RAF origins
International airports in Iceland